Hólmar Örn Rúnarsson (born ) is an Icelandic footballer. He is a midfielder and plays for Víðir. He has been selected for the Iceland national football team four times without making an appearance.

Career
Rúnarsson began his career as a youth player with Keflavík, before moving on to play for their senior team. In 2006, he moved to Danish club Silkeborg, where he spent two years before returning to Keflavík in 2008. He left the side in 2010, signing for Úrvalsdeild champions FH, where he spent four years. In 2014, he signed for Keflavík for a third time on a two-year contract.

In 2019, Rúnarsson joined Víðir.

References

External links

1981 births
Living people
Holmar Orn Runarsson
Holmar Orn Runarsson
Association football midfielders
Holmar Orn Runarsson
Danish Superliga players
Silkeborg IF players
Holmar Orn Runarsson
Holmar Orn Runarsson
Expatriate men's footballers in Denmark
Holmar Orn Runarsson